Bazm (also known as Bāz) is a village in Sarvestan Rural District, in the Central District of Bavanat County, Fars Province, Iran. At the 2006 census, its population was 422, in 111 families.

References 

Populated places in Bavanat County